The 2000 Dakar Rally, also known as the 2000 Dakar–Cairo Rally, was the 22nd running of the Dakar Rally event. The event began on 6 January 2000 in Senegal and ended on 23 January in Cairo. It had been re-routed to avoid Mauritania following an armed robbery of competitors in the 1999 rally. Four stages of the rally scheduled to be held in Niger were cancelled following a reported terrorist threat. Competitors were airlifted from Niamey airport to Libya where the rally was restarted five days later at Sabha. The rally was won by French driver Jean-Louis Schlesser and his co-driver Henri Magne in a Schlesser-Renault buggy., with the motorcycle title going to BMW's Richard Sainct and the truck title to Kamaz's Vladimir Chagin.

Stages

Stage Results

Motorcycles

Cars

Trucks

Final standings

Motorcycles

Cars

Trucks

References

Dakar Rally
Dakar Rally
Dakar Rally
2000 in French motorsport